The Penal Code is a 1932 American film directed by George Melford.

Plot summary 
A man serves time in prison, going to disguise his whereabouts from his family. After he is released a blackmail scheme ensues.

Cast 
Regis Toomey as Robert Palmer
Helen Cohan as Marguerite ("Margie") Shannon
Patrick H. O'Malley, Jr. as Sergeant Detective W. J. Bender
Robert Ellis as James Forrester
Virginia True Boardman as Mrs. Sarah Palmer
Henry Hall as Mr. Shannon
Leander De Cordova as Isaac Lewin
John Ince as Warden
Murdock MacQuarrie as Lefty
Olin Francis as McCarthy

References

External links 

1932 films
American crime drama films
1930s English-language films
American black-and-white films
1932 crime drama films
Films directed by George Melford
Films with screenplays by F. Hugh Herbert
1930s American films